Grigoriy Tsnobiladze is a Russian professional rugby union player who plays as a prop for Krasny Yar.

Background
Grigoriy Tsnobiladze was born in a Russian city of Vorkuta to Georgian parents. Shortly after his birth the family moved to Georgia, where Grigoriy started playing rugby at the age of 13-14.

Club career
He played for Aia Kutaisi until 2005. In 2005 he signed a contract with Novokuznetsk, where he played until 2011 save for a
short 6-months spell at Castres Olympique in 2006. In 2011 he signed with Krasny Yar.

International career
Grigoriy Tsnobiladze played 22 matches for Russia. His debut was in 2011 in a match v Italy A.

Personal life
Grigoriy's older brother Valery also played rugby. Grigoriy Tsnobiladze is married and has two sons.

External links
Itsrugby profile
EPCR profile
ESPN profile

References 

1983 births
Living people
Russian rugby union players
Russia international rugby union players
Rugby union props